(born  in Tsurugashima) is a Japanese retired bobsledder and sprinter.

Bobsleigh career
Sato competed at the 2014 Winter Olympics for Japan. He teamed with driver Hiroshi Suzuki, Toshiki Kuroiwa and Hisashi Miyazaki in the four-man event, finishing 26th.

Sato made his World Cup debut in December 2013. As of April 2014, his best finish is 19th, in a pair of events in 2012-13 at Lake Placid.

International competitions

Athletics career
He was part of the Waseda University team that won the 4 × 100 metres relay at the 1999 and 2000 Japanese Championships. He was also the 2004 Japanese National Sports Festival champion in the 100 metres and the 1995 Japanese Junior High School Championships champion in the 400 metres.

Personal bests
100 metres – 10.36 (Kumagaya 2004)
200 metres – 20.83 (+1.2 m/s) (Yokohama 2000)

Coaching career
He was the men's and women's sprint coach of track and field club at Daito Bunka University from 2009 to 2017 and later became men's and women's sprint director in 2018. Before that, he was the coach of track and field club at Sayamagaoka High School for three years.

He is currently coach of Japanese sprinters Kirara Shiraishi and Shuhei Tada.

References

External links

Shintaro Sato at JOC 
Shintaro Sato at Daito Bunka University 

1980 births
Living people
Olympic bobsledders of Japan
Sportspeople from Saitama Prefecture
Bobsledders at the 2014 Winter Olympics
Japanese male bobsledders
Japanese male sprinters
Waseda University alumni
Japanese athletics coaches
21st-century Japanese people